Tropolone is an organic compound with the chemical formula .  It is a pale yellow solid that is soluble in organic solvents.  The compound has been of interest to research chemists because of its unusual electronic structure and its role as a ligand precursor.  Although not usually prepared from tropone, it can be viewed as its derivative with a hydroxyl group in the 2-position.

Synthesis and reactions
Many methods have been described for the synthesis of tropolone. One involves bromination of 1,2-cycloheptanedione with N-bromosuccinimide followed by dehydrohalogenation at elevated temperatures, while another uses acyloin condensation of the ethyl ester of pimelic acid the acyloin again followed by oxidation by bromine.

An alternate route is a [2+2] cycloaddition of cyclopentadiene with a ketene to give a bicyclo[3.2.0]heptyl structure, followed by hydrolysis and breakage of the fusion bond to give the single ring:

Thy hydroxyl group of tropolone is acidic, having a pKa of 7, which is in between that of phenol (10) and benzoic acid (4). The increased acidity compared to phenol is due to resonance stabilization with the carbonyl group, as a vinylogous carboxylic acid.

The compound readily undergoes O-alkylation to give cycloheptatrienyl derivatives, which in turn are versatile synthetic intermediates. With metal cations, it undergoes deprotonation to form a bidentate ligand, such as in the  complex.

The carbonyl group is also highly polarized, as common for tropones. There can be substantial hydrogen bonding between it and the hydroxyl group, leading to rapid tautomerization: the structure is symmetric on the NMR timescale.

Natural occurrence 
Around 200 naturally occurring tropolone derivatives have been isolated, mostly from plants and fungi. Tropolone arises via a polyketide pathway, which affords a phenolic intermediate that undergoes ring expansion.

They are especially found in specific plant species, such as Cupressaceae and Liliaceae families. Tropolones are mostly abundant in the heartwood, leaves and bark of plants, thereby the essential oils are rich in various types of tropolones. The first natural tropolone derivatives were studied and purified in the mid-1930s and early-1940s. Thuja plicata, Thujopsis dolabrata, Chamaecyparis obtusa, Chamaecyparis taiwanensis and Juniperus thurifera were in the list of trees from which the first tropolones were identified. The first synthetic tropolones were thujaplicins derived by Ralph Raphael.

Biological effects 
It is an inhibitor of grape polyphenol oxidase and mushroom tyrosinase.

Tropolone derivatives

References 

 
Dopamine beta hydroxylase inhibitors
Vinylogous carboxylic acids